The 2010–11 Greek Basket League was the 71st season of the Greek Basket League, the highest tier professional basketball league in Greece.  The 182-game regular season (26 games for each of the 14 teams) began on Saturday, October 4, 2010, and ended on Wednesday, April 20, 2011. The league's playoffs ended on June 8, 2011.

Teams

Regular season

Standings

Pts=Points, Pld=Matches played, W=Matches won, L=Matches lost, F=Points for, A=Points against, D=Points difference

Playoffs
Teams in italics had home advantage. Teams in bold won the playoff series. Numbers to the left of each team indicate the team's original playoff seeding. Numbers to the right indicate the score of each playoff game.

Final league standings

Maroussi forfeited its place in the Eurocup 2011−12 Regular Season.

Awards

MVP
 Dimitris Diamantidis – Panathinaikos

Finals MVP
 Dimitris Diamantidis – Panathinaikos

Best Young Player
 Kostas Sloukas – Aris

Best Defender
 Dimitris Diamantidis – Panathinaikos

Most Improved Player
 Nick Calathes – Panathinaikos

Coach of the Year
 Željko Obradović – Panathinaikos

Greek League Best Five

References

External links
 Official HEBA Site
 Official Hellenic Basketball Federation Site
 GalanisSportsData.com A1 Stats

Greek Basket League seasons
1
Greek